Maria Kristina Cassandra "KC" Cuneta Concepcion (born April 7, 1985) is a Filipino actress, singer, dancer, TV host, entrepreneur, socialite and humanitarian. She has had lead roles in Philippine films For The First Time (2008) and When I Met U (2009), and television series such as Lovers in Paris (2009), Huwag Ka Lang Mawawala (2013) and Ikaw Lamang (2014).

She is often dubbed as the "Mega Daughter", in reference to her mother Sharon Cuneta's honorific as the "Megastar". She is also the first National Ambassador Against Hunger of the United Nations' World Food Programme. She is also the new ambassador of World Wide Fund for Nature (WWF) Philippines. In addition, she also sang in the 2011 SEA Games opening production along with the Agnez Mo and Jaclyn Victor held in Indonesia.

Personal life
Concepcion is the daughter of singer-actress Sharon Cuneta and actor Gabby Concepcion, and the adopted daughter of Senator Francis Pangilinan following her mother's marriage to him. She reconnected with her father after thirteen years since her parents' annulment and his immigration to the United States in 1995.

She graduated grade school at Saint Pedro Poveda College in Mandaluyong. In 2003, she graduated from the International School Manila, and in 2007, graduated with a bachelor's degree in International Corporate Communications with a minor in Theatre Arts from the American University of Paris.

Career
Concepcion made several guest appearances in her mother's concerts and television shows. In 2003, she became a product endorser both on television and in print ads. She started her career with global franchise MTV as an MTV Asia VJ.

As World Food Programme's Philippine ambassador, she shared the stage with Bill Clinton in 2008 to present the former US leader's foundation its commitment to feed more people in impoverish countries.

In 2009, she starred in the Philippine remake of her first primetime drama series, Lovers in Paris as a Kapamilya. In 2010, she returned to do a film with Star Cinema with her first movie with her father, Gabby Concepcion, for Father's Day, I'll Be There, directed by Maryo J. de los Reyes. In her 2010 studio album titled KC, she sang "Girl Most Likely To" by Skye Sweetnam from the soundtrack of Mattel's 2006 film The Barbie Diaries. In the same year, she joined Star Magic but after a year, she left and joined Viva Artist Agency, a talent management of Viva Entertainment.

On the April 11, 2010 episode of The Buzz, it was announced that Concepción had been chosen to be the replacement co-host after Ruffa Gutierrez's departure. She was also featured on the cover of Cosmopolitan Mexico. In 2011, she made another film with Star Cinema, a romantic, drama film Forever and a Day.

In 2012, she hosted the first and only season of The X Factor Philippines. She was also featured in USA's Complex Magazine as one of The 25 Sexiest International Actresses.

In 2013, she starred in her first lead antagonist role in Huwag Ka Lang Mawawala. In 2014, she starred a lead role as Natalia in the second season of the period drama series Ikaw Lamang. In 2015, she returned and starred a lead role as Anna in Christmas Special Series of ABS-CBN, Give Love on Christmas, and was named one of GQ India's Hottest Actresses Around the World. In 2016, she returned as the host in Binibining Pilipinas 2016 along with co-host and actor Xian Lim. She was also the host of Binibining Pilipinas 2011 five years ago with co-host and actor Derek Ramsay. She took a step back from showbiz for a while to focus as being the UN Ambassador of World Food Programme for Hunger and made an online shop website KC's Closet and reached 1,000,000 pesos and being donated in Public School in Maguindanao.

In 2019, KC was the first Filipina celebrity to represent global brand Shiseido as an ambassador and endorser.

She is set to make a showbiz comeback after signing an exclusive management contract with Cornerstone Entertainment.

Music

2008-2009: a.k.a Cassandra 
In 2008, KC Concepción released her first studio album on July 15, 2008 entitled "a.k.a Cassandra", on the Sony BMG Philippines label, which ranked number 1 based on total album sales in all Odyssey Record Bar branches nationwide. In fact, 1,102 copies of the album were sold in all Odyssey branches alone. KC Concepción made Philippine music history with her lead single "Imposible" during that year. KC has the most number of music downloads in the Philippines in the same year, which marked 1 million downloads online. KC Concepción thought that she would just perform her newest single, "Doo Be Doo", on the noontime TV show Wowowee on ABS-CBN Channel 2 on November 15, 2008. However, she was surprised when she was given a Platinum Record Award for her album "a.k.a. Cassandra".

2010-2011: KC 
In, 2010 KC released her Second Studio Album entitled KC, KC ranked number 3 based on OPM charts, in Astrovision Stores the album KC reached number 1. KC was launched on ASAP XV. KC was released on March 24, 2010, under the Sony Music label. she also set KC Mall Tour to promote KC album.

Acting

Theater
2003, The Little Mermaid
2005, Beauty and the Beast
2008, Katy, the Musical Concert

Television

Films

Discography

Studio albums 
 a.k.a Cassandra (2008)
 KC (2010)

Soundtrack 
 For the First Time (2008)
 When I Met You (2009)
 Forever and a Day (2011)

Awards, nominations and recognitions

References

External links 
 
 
 KC Concepcion on Instagram

Filipino child actresses
Filipino film actresses
Filipino television actresses
21st-century Filipino women singers
Filipino people of American descent
Filipino people of Spanish descent
Filipino expatriates in France
1985 births
Living people
Pangilinan family
Star Circle Quest
Star Magic
American University of Paris alumni
VJs (media personalities)
Filipino people of Kapampangan descent
Viva Artists Agency
ABS-CBN personalities
Filipino musical theatre actresses
Ambassadors of supra-national bodies
World Food Programme people